The Program for Torture Victims (PTV) is a non-profit organization that provides medical, psychological, case management and legal services to torture survivors. PTV serves more than 300 victims of state-sponsored torture from over 65 countries annually.

History
The Program for Torture Victims (PTV) was founded in 1980 by Dr. José Quiroga and Ana Deutsch.

Both Quiroga and Deutsch sought asylum in the United States and met in Los Angeles in 1979.  They began working on a campaign against torture with the Los Angeles Amnesty International Medical Group. The organization was conducting a study documenting cases of torture and the consequences for refugees and asylum-seekers in the United States. Quiroga assessed the medical consequences of torture while Deutsch assessed the victims' psychological well-being. However, Amnesty International decided that they, as an organization, were unable to provide direct treatment to torture survivors. Quiroga and Deutsch knew that the torture survivors with whom they had been working needed rehabilitation services and decided to start the Program for Torture Victims.

After the study by the Amnesty International Medical Group was completed, Quiroga presented it to the American Psychological Association. This was among the first research on the medical and psychological consequences of torture. Quiroga and Deutsch quickly became known as professionals treating victims of torture. It wasn't until 1987, years after PTV began, that the United Nations Convention Against Torture and Other Cruel, Inhuman or Degrading Treatment or Punishment was enforced and torture was legally recognized and defined for the first time

Quiroga and Deutsch began to treat clients in local clinics and in their own homes. Partnering with organizations such as Clinica Monseñor Oscar A. Romero, El Rescate, CARECEN and Amanecer, PTV quickly became well known in the Central American refugee community. Quiroga, having already been a volunteer at Venice Family Clinic for years, formed a partnership in which he was able to use their facilities to see PTV patients. Based in a small apartment at the time, Venice Family Clinic is now the largest community clinic in the U.S. and still home to PTV's medical office.

In 1994, PTV received its first grant from the United Nations Voluntary Fund for Victims of Torture and was incorporated as a 501 (c)3 non-profit organization. Several years later, in 2000, PTV received a federal grant for $2 million over a four-year period, allowing PTV to add staff and relocate the administrative office from Ms. Deutsch's home to downtown Los Angeles. With paid staff and a central office, PTV was finally able to expand its scope to include areas like research and evaluation.

Demographics
According to a report by the U.S. Refugee Admissions Program (USRAP), 48,217 refugees were admitted into the U.S. in 2007. Of that total, 2,619 (5.43%) resettled in Florida, 2,978 (6.18%) relocated to New York and 6,699 (13.89%) chose to resettle in California; making the latter home to more incoming refugees than the next two states combined. Of all those who sought to make California their new home, 4,645 (69%) resettled in the five counties PTV serves - Los Angeles, Orange, Riverside, San Bernardino and Ventura. Out of all of the counties in California, The Los Angeles Federal Immigration Court had greatest number of asylum seekers with 4,064. Between 2002 and 2008, the L.A. Federal Immigration Court adjudicated the highest number of asylum applications of any immigration court in California with 69,172 cases - 63% of the state total. As states, Florida and New York had 75,499 and 73,746 applications for asylum, respectively; just a fraction more than L.A. County alone.

Client demographics
The demographic makeup of PTV's client population is ever-changing, as global, regional, and national sociopolitical dynamics are constantly in flux. Thus far, PTV has served clients from over 65 countries.

Services
The Program for Torture Victims (PTV) has developed an integrated, comprehensive approach to rehabilitation. Clients see a PTV case manager, physician and psychotherapist. PTV partners with some of the region's leading service providers, including the Venice Family Clinic, Clinica Oscar Romero, the Legal Aid Foundation of Los Angeles and Public Counsel, among others.

Medical evaluation and treatment
Clients are evaluated by a PTV physician. When specialized procedures are needed, a wide network of physicians at the Venice Family Clinic and other local health care organizations are utilized at no cost to the client. PTV also offers ongoing consultation and trains health and mental health care providers on treating survivors of torture.

Psychological evaluation and counseling
PTV uses an integrated approach to rehabilitation that addresses the needs of torture survivors. This includes psychological evaluation, individual and family psychotherapy, psychiatric evaluation and follow-up, and psychological affidavits for asylum seekers in immigration court.
Working with Families - PTV works with family members of torture survivors. The overall goal of intervention is to restore a healthy dynamic after the rupture created by persecution, uncertainty, and separation.
Healing Club - The Healing Club is an informal gathering of clients, their family, and staff for cultural and recreational activities.  This activity creates a sense of community among and between torture survivors from different countries, religions, and ethnic backgrounds.
Women’s Support Group - Nearly half of PTV’s clients are women.  The aim of the program is to empower them to recover their inner strengths and hope for the future.
Asylum Readiness Group - This group provides clients with information about the asylum process, and addresses ways to reduce the stress that accompanies the process.  The goal is to give survivors confidence and optimism about their future.

Legal support and training
Most of PTV's clients seek refuge in the United States as asylum seekers. As the largest port of entry to torture survivors, Los Angeles has the highest number of asylum claims filed in the United States.

PTV's staff prepares forensic medical and psychological evaluations and serve as expert witnesses in federal immigration court. Reliving horrific experiences through testimony can be extremely traumatic to the survivor.  The PTV clinical staff prepares the client for the emotional responses they might have on the stand.  The presence of a trusted PTV volunteer or staff member can provide the extra moral support a client needs to answer questions clearly and in the necessary detail about the experience.

PTV also works with an extensive network of attorneys to ensure legal assistance for clients.

Social services and healing groups
PTV provides emergency assistance with referrals for temporary shelter, food and other basic needs, as well as support in finding permanent housing and good jobs. They have also established support groups that create a sense of community for clients, address their various needs and help them become spokespeople against torture.

Social Services offered:
Food and clothing distribution
Locate temporary housing and rental assistance
Referrals for job training, employment, and education
Transportation
Interpreter services
Client Emergency Fund

Research evaluation
PTV is a resource for research information on torture survivors. They have created an extensive database with information on treatment outcomes for torture survivors, and are working to create a powerful resource for lawmakers to address policy issues related to the asylum process.

Public education, advocacy, and legislative work
PTV initiates public programs to educate the general public about the use of torture worldwide and its consequences for individuals and society. They also engage elected officials and policymakers in efforts to combat torture and advocate for resources to facilitate the healing of torture survivors and their families.

PTV also collaborates with local organizations to host public programs for events such as the United Nations International Day in Support of Victims of Torture.

References

External links

Human rights organizations based in the United States
Torture